Syosset  (also known as Little East Woods or Locust Grove) is a hamlet and census-designated place in the Town of Oyster Bay, in Nassau County, on the North Shore of Long Island, in New York, United States. The population was 19,259 at the 2020 census.

Syosset is served by the Syosset LIRR station, the Syosset Post Office, the Syosset Central School District, the Syosset Public Library, the Syosset Fire Department, and the Jericho Water District.

Geography

The Syosset CDP absorbed the hamlet and former CDP of Locust Grove for the 1990 census. Furthermore, Syosset gained some territory between the 2000 census and 2010 census from Muttontown, and also lost some territory which was annexed to the Village of Laurel Hollow.

It borders Oyster Bay and Laurel Hollow to the north, Woodbury to the east, Plainview and Hicksville to the south, and Jericho and Muttontown to the west, Syosset is accessible to New York City by the LIRR and the Long Island Expressway by car.

Demographics

As of the 2020 U.S. Census, there were 19,259 people, 6,170 households, and 5,307 families residing in Syosset. The population density was 3,785.8 per square mile (1,434.8/km2). There were 6,354 housing units at an average density of 1,274.5/sq mi (491.6/km2). The racial makeup of Syosset was 56.2% White, 0.7% African American, 0.2% Native American, 36.2% Asian, 0.02% Pacific Islander, 0.8% from other races, and 1.6% from two or more races. 5.0% are Hispanic or Latino of any race. Syosset, like many other towns on the North Shore of Long Island, has a large Jewish population, as well as a large number of residents of East Asian origin. 31.9% of the population spoke a language other than English at home, mostly Chinese or Korean.

There were 8,131 households, out of which 25.6% had children under the age of 18 living with them, 75.5% were married couples living together, 7.5% had a female householder with no husband present, and 14.4% were non-families. 12.6% of all households were made up of individuals, and 7.6% had someone living alone who was 65 years of age or older. The average household size was 3.05 and the average family size was 3.33.

In Syosset, the population was spread out, with 26.0% under the age of 18, 5.6% from 18 to 24, 26.3% from 25 to 44, 27.1% from 45 to 64, and 15.0% who were 65 years of age or older. The median age was 41 years. For every 100 females, there were 96.2 males. For every 100 females age 18 and over, there were 90.5 males.

The median income for a household in Syosset was $158,145, and the median income for a family was $181,648. Males had a median income of $109,742 versus $77,038 for females. The per capita income for Syosset was $59,140. About 1.6% of families and 2.8% of the population were below the poverty line, including 2.4% of those under age 18 and 4.3% of those age 65 or over. The median home value is $749,628.

Fire department
Syosset is protected by the firefighters and EMTs of the Syosset Fire Department (SFD), which consists of five all-volunteer fire companies and one all-volunteer EMS company. The Syosset Fire Department currently operates out of three Fire Stations, located throughout the area, which encompasses Syosset, Woodbury, and parts of Muttontown, Oyster Bay Cove, Laurel Hollow, Cold Spring Harbor, East Norwich, Jericho, Hicksville, and Plainview.  At 14.4 square miles, it is the largest coverage area in Nassau County.  They operate a fire apparatus fleet of five Engines, two Trucks, one Rescue, three Ambulances, and several special, support, and reserve units.

Notable people
The 11791 ZIP Code includes portions of the incorporated villages of Muttontown, Laurel Hollow, and Oyster Bay Cove, which results in a Syosset mailing address. Consequently, the news and media often erroneously report Syosset as the hometown of notable residents of said villages.

 3LAU, DJ
 Judd Apatow, screenwriter, television producer and film producer
 Ian "Aesop Rock" Bavitz, hip-hop musician
 Jay Bienstock, Emmy Award–winning producer of Survivor and The Apprentice
 Sue Bird, Israeli-American Women's National Basketball Association point guard, 4× WNBA champion, 5× Olympic champion, 12× All-Star (Seattle Storm)
 Alan S. Blinder, economist, Professor of Economics & Public Affairs at Princeton University, Vice Chairman of the Board of Governors of the Federal Reserve System 1994–1996, writer, author, and columnist
 Leslie Buck, businessman, designer of the Anthora coffee cup
 Elaine Chao, former US Secretary of Transportation
 Ben Ehrenreich, novelist
 William Everdell, historian
 Alex Flinn, novelist
 Bev Francis, IFBB professional Australian female bodybuilder, powerlifter, and national shot put champion
 Sibel Galindez, actress
 Jared Grasso, college basketball coach
 Eric Haber, professional poker player and hedge-fund manager
 Chris Heintz, former MLB player and current manager of Minnesota Twins minor league affiliate
 Alfred Hershey (1908–1997), Nobel Prize–winning bacteriologist and geneticist
 Michael Isikoff, investigative journalist
 Andrew Jones, hockey player, radio personality, engineer
 Cliff Josephy, professional poker player
 Ned Lamont, 89th governor of Connecticut
 Michael Lohan, television personality and father of actress Lindsay Lohan
 Jon Lovett, podcast host, screenwriter, former speechwriter for Barack Obama 
 Derick Martini, screenwriter, film director
 Robert Maschio, actor (Dr. Todd "The Todd" Quinlan on Scrubs)
 Idina Menzel, actress and singer
 Grant Napear, broadcast journalist, Sacramento Kings (NBA) play-by-play announcer
 Ed Newman, former NFL All-Pro offensive guard who played for the Miami Dolphins
 Eric Nystrom, NHL player
 Adam Pascal, actor
 Natalie Portman, actress
 Sal Romano, MLB pitcher for the Cincinnati Reds 
 Howie Rose, sportscaster for New York Mets, New York Islanders
 Gabe Rotter, novelist, television writer and producer
 Jim Rowinski, former NBA player; Big Ten MVP
 Dave Rubin, comedian and television personality
 Christopher "Mad Dog" Russo, sportscaster and sports journalist
 Rob Scuderi, NHL player and Stanley Cup champion with the Pittsburgh Penguins
 Gail G. Shapiro, pediatric allergist
 Maryann Ridini Spencer, award-winning screenwriter, author, producer and TV Host
 Kiri Te Kanawa, opera singer
 Mikey Wax, musician
 Meg Wolitzer, novelist
Irad Young (born 1971), American-Israeli soccer player 
 Jordan Young, television producer and writer

In popular culture
 The Wednesday Wars by Gary D. Schmidt takes place in Syosset in 1967.
 In Adam Sandler's Mr. Deeds, Winona Ryder's character says she is originally from Syosset.
 In New York Minute, Mary-Kate and Ashley Olsen's characters live with their father in Syosset.
 Secrets and Wives features wealthy women from Old Westbury, Roslyn, and Syosset.
 Asteroid 250774 Syosset, discovered by Richard Kowalski in 2005, was named for the hamlet on Long Island. The official  was published by the Minor Planet Center on January 9, 2020.
 In Soapdish, Whoopi Goldberg's character reveals that Montana Moorhead was formerly Milton Moorhead of Syosset, Long Island.
 In the Comedy Central show Review (season 1, episode 3) the viewer question about pancakes comes from "Nick from Syosset, New York".
 In the 2021 television series Gossip Girl the character Julien Calloway mentions that she turned down a sponsorship from a strip mall in Syosset in the first episode of season 1.
 In Only Murders in the Building the character Oliver Putnam mentions that he threw up in a pool at a wedding in Syosset.

References

External links

 Syosset Chamber of Commerce

 
Census-designated places in New York (state)
Hamlets in New York (state)
Census-designated places in Nassau County, New York
Hamlets in Nassau County, New York